The men's 105 kilograms weightlifting event at the 2012 Summer Olympics in London, United Kingdom, took place at ExCeL London.

Summary
Total score was the sum of the lifter's best result in each of the snatch and the clean and jerk, with three lifts allowed for each lift.  In case of a tie, the lighter lifter won; if still tied, the lifter who took the fewest attempts to achieve the total score won.  Lifters without a valid snatch score did not perform the clean and jerk.

Russia's Khadzhimurat Akkaev and Dmitry Klokov were on the start list but did not compete. Akkaev later failed a drug test, and it was suggested that they did not compete to cover-up their use of performance enhancing drugs.

On 22 December 2018, it was announced that Ukraine's Oleksiy Torokhtiy, who had originally been the gold medalist, and Uzbek Ruslan Nurudinov, who had originally finished fourth, had tested positive for performance-enhancing drugs. 

In May 2019, Nurudinov was disqualified, and in December 2019, Torokhtiy was also disqualified. Medals were reallocated.

Schedule
All times are British Summer Time (UTC+01:00)

Records

Results

References 

Weightlifting at the 2012 Summer Olympics
Men's events at the 2012 Summer Olympics